Eda Tekin is a Turkish freestyle wrestler competing in the 57 kg division. She is a member of Antalya GSİM.

Career 
In 2018, she won the bronze medal in the women's 55 kg event at the 2018 European Juniors Wrestling Championships held in Rome, Italia.

In 2019, Eda Tekin won a silver medal in the women's 55 kg event at the 2019 European U23 Wrestling Championship in Romania.

At the 2021 U23 World Wrestling Championships held in Belgrade, Serbia, she won one of the bronze medals in the 55 kg event.

References

External links 
 

Living people
Turkish female sport wrestlers
1999 births
20th-century Turkish sportswomen
21st-century Turkish sportswomen